Jutta Stienen (born 3 August 1972) is a Swiss racing cyclist. She competed in the 2013 UCI women's time trial in Florence.

References

External links

1972 births
Living people
Swiss female cyclists
Place of birth missing (living people)